The Gyeonggi dialect or Seoul dialect of the Korean language is the prestige dialect of the language and the basis of the standardized form used in South Korea. It is spoken throughout the Korean Peninsula and in the Korean diaspora, but it is mainly concentrated in the Seoul National Capital Area, the most densely populated part of South Korea, which includes the cities of Seoul and Incheon, as well as the whole Gyeonggi Province. It is also spoken in the city of Kaesong and the counties of Kaepung and Changpung in North Korea.

More recently, Gyeonggi dialect has seen increased use in online contexts, in turn leading to the majority of young Koreans' use of the dialect, regardless of their regional affiliation. The prolific use of online communication channels is expected to lead to a wider adoption of Gyeonggi dialect, in lieu of distinct, regional dialects.

Pronunciation
The vowels for e and ae are merged for young speakers and vowel length is not distinguished consistently, if at all. Among young speakers or in informal contexts, the postpositions -do (-도, "also"), -ro (-로, "to") and -go (-고, "and then") and their derivatives tend to be pronounced with -du (-두), -ru (-루) and -gu (-구). The sentence-final verb ending -yo tends to be pronounced with a schwa, which is sometimes transcribed as -yeo (-여) on the Internet in informal contexts.

Samchon (삼촌, "uncle") is usually pronounced as samchun (삼춘), as are some other words spelt with 'ㅗ' in standard Korean (사돈-사둔, 정도-정두)

Young Seoul dialect speakers tend to end interrogative sentences (questions) with -nya? (-냐?). They also use unique intonations slightly different from those used by broadcast news readers. The informal ending -eo (-어) is also used quite commonly in both Seoul dialect questions and sentences.

A 2013 study by Kang Yoon-jung and Han Sung-woo, which compared voice recordings of Seoul speech from 1935 and 2005, found that in recent years, lenis consonants (ㅂㅈㄷㄱ), aspirated consonants (ㅍㅊㅌㅋ) and fortis consonants (ㅃㅉㄸㄲ) were shifting from a distinction via voice onset time to that of pitch change, and suggests that the Seoul dialect is currently undergoing tonogenesis. Kim Mi-Ryoung (2013) notes that these sound shifts still show variations among different speakers, suggesting that the transition is still ongoing. Cho Sung-hye (2017) examined 141 Seoul dialect speakers, and concluded that these pitch changes were originally initiated by females born in the 1950s, and has almost reached completion in the speech of those born in the 1990s. On the other hand, Choi Ji-youn et al. (2020) disagree with the suggestion that the consonant distinction shifting away from voice onset time is due to the introduction of tonal features, and instead proposes that it is a prosodically conditioned change.

Variations in accent
The Seoul accent can be divided into  three variations: conservative, general, and modified. The conservative form is often found in those who have been born or have lived in Seoul before the industrialization in the 1970s (i.e. old natives of Seoul). To some people, this can slightly sound like a North Korean accent. Good examples can be found in speeches of a Seoul-born famous singer, Lee Mun-se. Older broadcast recordings (especially those from the 1980s at least) can also be typical examples of this accent. The accent used in the Daehan News, a government-made film-based news media, may be a humorous version of this accent.

The general form can be found in speeches by nearly all broadcast news anchors these days. This variation may lie in between the conservative and the modified forms. This accent may be used for recordings of Korean language listening comprehension tests to high school students and is considered to be the standard/formal South Korean accent. Hence, news anchors and reporters who have mastered this dialect for their profession are considered to be South Korea's most grammatically/linguistically accurate, precise, and eloquent citizens.

The last variation is usually spoken by younger generations (including teenagers) and lower-class middle-aged people in the Seoul Metropolitan Area. Some middle and upper-class people in Seoul may speak with this accent due to lack of 'rigid' lingual education policies.

This variation has emerged in public since the early 1990s. Even a few young broadcast news anchors may speak with some features of this accent nowadays, especially when they present in entertainment programs rather than radio news. The most notable characteristic of this form is that the pitch goes up at the end of a sentence, which many people who speak with Gyeongsang accents find offensive or irritating. The pitch-up feature is due to influence by migrants from the Jeolla region into Seoul during the industrialization.

Geographic subdivisions 
Traditionally, there was some variation in the speech of Gyeonggi locals from north and south of the Han River. In Northern regions, especially in Kaeseong and Ganghwa County), influence from the Hwanghae/Pyongan dialect can be displayed in the pronunciation of 겠(kes) as 갔(kas) or the use of vocabulary like 무유(muyu, radish) and 켠(kyun, corner/side) instead of 무(mu) and 편(pyeon). Meanwhile, southern Gyeonggi locals (such as in Pyeongtaek, which historically was once part of Chungcheong Province) were displayed to have some influence from the Chungcheong/Yeongseo dialects by following the umlaut of the Chungcheong dialect in words like 고기(gogi) and 옮기다(olmgida), which become 괴기(gwaegi) and 욂기다(oelmkida) or the use of vocabulary like 졸(jol) and 바우(bau) for 부추(buchu) and 바위(bawi). Coastal regions (most notably in Incheon, Siheung, Gimpo and southern areas of Ongjin County) can have influence from both regions, due to contact with people from both regions through fishing and trade. However, due to the division of Korea and the mass migration of people from southern provinces during and after the 1970s, this regional difference is now almost nonexistent among most modern day Gyeonggi locals and is only noticeable in the speech of elderly locals of Gyeonggi, with traces of this being displayed among some middle aged Gyeonggi locals (especially those from rural backgrounds or whose families originally came from Gyeonggi Province).

However, one notable linguistic difference between northern and southern Gyeonggi that still exists today is the shortening of '거야' (geoya, a suffix used for emphasis or in a question), to '거' (geo). This colloquial feature, which is most commonly used in Southern Gyeonggi, particularly in and around Suwon, is likely one of the last regionalisms of the gyeonggi dialect that remains in common use.

See also
Dialectology
Dialects of Korean
South Korean standard language

References

Korean dialects
Languages of South Korea
Languages of North Korea
Culture of Seoul
Culture of Incheon
Culture in Gyeonggi Province
Korean language in South Korea